The 1973 NBA All-Star Game was played at Chicago Stadium in Chicago on January 23, 1973.

MVP: Dave Cowens

Coaches: East: Tom Heinsohn, West: Bill Sharman.

Eastern Conference

Western Conference

Score by periods
 

Halftime— East, 50-45
Third Quarter— East, 76-65
Officials: Richie Powers and Jake O'Donnell
Attendance: 17,527.

References

National Basketball Association All-Star Game
All-Star
Basketball competitions in Chicago